Corey Colehour (born September 2, 1945) is a former gridiron football quarterback who played in the Canadian Football League. He played college football at North Dakota.

Early life and high school
Colehour was born and grew up in Minneapolis, Minnesota and attended Southwest High School, where he played football and basketball. As a senior he was named the MVP of the Minneapolis City Conference in basketball.

College career
Colehour was a three-year starter at North Dakota. He was named All-North Central Conference (NCC) as junior. Colehour was again named All-NCC and the conference MVP as a senior after passing for 2,175 yards and 19 touchdowns. He was named the MVP of the 1966 Pecan Bowl after passing for 274 yards and four touchdowns in a 42–24 win over Parsons College. Over the course of his collegiate career, Colehour completed 312 of 581 pass attempts for 4,520 yards with 36 touchdown passes. He was inducted into the North Dakota's Athletic Hall of Fame in 1983.

Professional career
Colehour was selected by the Atlanta Falcons in the seventh round of the 1967 NFL Draft. He spent 1967 on the Falcons' practice squad and was cut during training camp in 1968. Colehour was signed by the Edmonton Eskimos of the Canadian Football League (CFL) for the rest of the team's season. He led the Eskimos with 1,947 passing yards in 1969. Colehour was released by Edmonton on July 27, 1970, during final roster cuts. He was signed as a running back by the Denver Broncos on August 3, 1970, but was cut seven days later.

References

1945 births
Living people
Players of American football from Minneapolis
American football quarterbacks
North Dakota Fighting Hawks football players
Edmonton Elks players
Atlanta Falcons players
Canadian football quarterbacks
American players of Canadian football
Sportspeople from Minneapolis
Players of Canadian football from Minnesota